Sugar Creek Township may refer to the following places in the United States:

Arkansas
 Sugar Creek Township, Benton County, Arkansas, in Benton County, Arkansas
 Sugar Creek Township, Greene County, Arkansas, in Greene County, Arkansas
 Sugar Creek Township, Logan County, Arkansas, in Logan County, Arkansas

Illinois
 Sugar Creek Township, Clinton County, Illinois

Indiana
 Sugar Creek Township, Boone County, Indiana
 Sugar Creek Township, Clinton County, Indiana
 Sugar Creek Township, Hancock County, Indiana
 Sugar Creek Township, Montgomery County, Indiana
 Sugar Creek Township, Parke County, Indiana
 Sugar Creek Township, Shelby County, Indiana
 Sugar Creek Township, Vigo County, Indiana

Iowa
 Sugar Creek Township, Cedar County, Iowa
 Sugar Creek Township, Poweshiek County, Iowa

Kansas
 Sugar Creek Township, Miami County, Kansas, in Miami County, Kansas

Missouri
 Sugar Creek Township, Barry County, Missouri
 Sugar Creek Township, Harrison County, Missouri

Ohio
 Sugar Creek Township, Allen County, Ohio
 Sugar Creek Township, Putnam County, Ohio
 Sugar Creek Township, Stark County, Ohio
 Sugar Creek Township, Tuscarawas County, Ohio
 Sugar Creek Township, Wayne County, Ohio

See also

Sugar Creek (disambiguation)
Sugarcreek Township (disambiguation)

Township name disambiguation pages